Lake Bosque Alegre (translates to Lake Happy Forest), is a fresh water crater lake located in the northern highlands of Costa Rica. It is part of a complex of lakes comprising Lake Hule, Lake Congo and Lake Bosque Alegre. The lakes are part of the Bosque Alegre Wildlife Refuge.

Location 

It is located in Los Ángeles Sur, of Río Cuarto canton, of Alajuela province.

Physical aspects 

Lake Bosque Alegre is a maar lake located within a crater, sharing a geological depression with Lake Hule and Lake Congo. There is no secondary volcanic activity present. There is a low possibility of volcanic gas fumes.

See also 
 List of lakes in Costa Rica

References 

Geography of Alajuela Province
Tourist attractions in Alajuela Province
Bosque Alegre